Universal Animation Studios (formerly known as Universal Cartoon Studios) is an American animation studio and a division of Universal Pictures, a subsidiary of NBCUniversal, which is owned by Comcast. It has produced direct-to-video sequels to Universal-released feature films, such as The Land Before Time, An American Tail, Balto, and Curious George, as well as other films and television series.

The actual animation production is done overseas, usually by either Wang Film Productions or Rough Draft Studios, while pre-production and post-production is United States-based.

The television animation divisions of Universal and DreamWorks merged on August 23, 2016 after Universal completed its acquisition of DreamWorks Animation, who began producing a majority of Universal Pictures' family friendly TV shows.

History

Universal Animation Studios was established in 1990 as Universal Cartoon Studios, the animation division of MCA Inc. Its debut work was Back to the Future: The Animated Series, which was announced on March 22, 1991, and premiered on CBS on September 14 the same year.

In 2006, Universal Cartoon Studios was renamed to Universal Animation Studios.

Franchises
This is not including the original films of Charlotte's Web, An American Tail, The Land Before Time  and Balto made by either Hanna-Barbera Productions, Sullivan Bluth Studios or Amblimation.

1:The date reflects the first appearance of Woody Woodpecker in a production from Universal Cartoon Studios rather than the date when the character was originally created in 1940 by Walter Lantz.

Filmography

Feature films

Theatrical feature films

Not released theatrically in the United States

Direct-to-video feature films

Kids feature films

Adult animated feature films

Released on Peacock.
Adult animated production.

Short films
 Fractured Fairy Tales: The Phox, the Box, & the Lox (1999) (theatrical release)

Television series

Television specials
 A Wish for Wings That Work (1991)
 Curious George: A Very Monkey Christmas (2009)
 How Murray Saved Christmas (2014)

Miscellaneous work
 63rd Academy Awards (1991) - animation for Woody Woodpecker presenting the award for Best Animated Short Film
 Kids WB! promos - Earthworm Jim segments.
 The Amazing Adventures of Spider-Man (1999) - traditionally-animated introduction
 Dudley-Do Right’s RipSaw Falls (1999) - traditionally-animated queue video.

Cancelled projects
 Escape from Jurassic Park, an animated TV series that takes place after the first Jurassic Park film, was confirmed to be in development and awaiting Steven Spielberg's approval in June 1993. The series would have centered on John Hammond's attempts to finish Jurassic Park and open it to the public, while InGen's corporate rival Biosyn is simultaneously planning to open their own dinosaur theme park in Brazil, which ultimately ends with their dinosaurs escaping into the jungles. Artist William Stout was hired to work on the series and subsequently made a trailer to demonstrate how the series would look, and how it would combine traditional animation with computer animation. The series required Spielberg's final approval before it could go into production. However, Spielberg had grown tired of the massive promotion and merchandise revolving around the film, and never watched the trailer. On July 13, 1993, Margaret Loesch, president of the Fox Children's Network, confirmed that discussions had been held with Spielberg about an animated version of the film. Loesch also said, "At least for now and in the foreseeable future, there will not be an animated Jurassic Park. That's Steven Spielberg's decision, and we respect that decision."
 A pair of traditionally animated cutscenes were produced for the 1996 video game Crash Bandicoot to serve as the game's intro and outro, as well as act as source material for a potential animated series if the game was well-received and commercially successful. The hand-drawn cutscenes were dropped after Sony Computer Entertainment picked up Crash Bandicoot for publication, as Sony desired to push the PlayStation's 3D polygonal graphics. The cutscenes were uploaded to YouTube by producer David Siller in 2015.
 Jurassic Park: Chaos Effect, an animated television series based on The Lost World: Jurassic Park, was confirmed to be in development within the third part of a four-part comic adaptation of the film published by Topps Comics in July 1997. In November 1997, it was reported that the cartoon would be accompanied by Jurassic Park: Chaos Effect, a series of dinosaur toys produced by Kenner and based on a premise that scientists had created dinosaur hybrids consisting of DNA from different creatures. That month, it was also reported that the cartoon could be ready by March 1998, as a mid-season replacement. The Chaos Effect toyline was released in June 1998, but the animated series was never produced, for unknown reasons.

See also
 Illumination
 DreamWorks Animation
 DreamWorks Animation Television
 Universal Interactive
 List of Universal Pictures theatrical animated feature films
 List of unproduced Universal Pictures animated projects
 List of animation studios owned by Comcast NBCUniversal

References

 
1990 establishments in California
American companies established in 1990
Mass media companies established in 1990
Universal Pictures subsidiaries
American animation studios
Television production companies of the United States
Companies based in Los Angeles County, California
Universal City, California
Adult animation studios